Askar Akayevich Akayev (born 10 November 1944) is a Kyrgyz politician who served as President of Kyrgyzstan from 1990 until being overthrown in the March 2005 Tulip Revolution.

Education and early career
Akayev was born in Kyzyl-Bayrak, Kirghiz Soviet Socialist Republic. He was the eldest of five sons born into a family of collective farm workers. He became a metalworker at a local factory in 1961. He subsequently moved to Leningrad, where he trained as a physicist and graduated from the Leningrad Institute of Precision Mechanics and Optics in 1967 with an honors degree in mathematics, engineering and computer science. He stayed at the institute until 1976, working as a senior researcher and teacher. In Leningrad he met and in 1970 married Mayram Akayeva with whom he now has two sons and two daughters. They returned to their native Kyrgyzstan in 1977, where he became a senior professor at the Frunze Polytechnic Institute. Some of his later cabinet members were former students and friends from his academic years.

He obtained a doctorate in 1981 from the Moscow Institute of Engineering and Physics, having written his dissertation on holographic systems of storage and transformation of information. In 1984, he became a member of the Kirghiz Academy of Sciences, rose to vice president of the academy in 1987 and then president of the academy in 1989. He was elected as a deputy in the Supreme Soviet of the USSR in the same year.

Political career

On 25 October 1990, the Kirghiz SSR's Supreme Soviet held elections for the newly created post of president of the republic. Two candidates contested the presidency, President of the Council of Ministers of Kirghiz SSR, Apas Jumagulov, and First Secretary of the Communist Party of the Kirghiz SSR, Absamat Masaliyev. However, neither Jumagulov nor Masaliyev received a majority of the votes cast. In accordance with the Kirghiz SSR's constitution of 1978, both candidates were disqualified and neither could run in the second round of voting.

Two days later, on 27 October, the Supreme Soviet selected Akayev who was effectively a compromise candidate to serve as the republic's first president. In 1991, he was offered the post of vice-president of the Soviet Union by President Mikhail Gorbachev, but refused. Akayev was elected president of the renamed Republic of Kyrgyzstan in an uncontested poll on 12 October 1991. He was reelected twice, amid allegations of ballot rigging, on 24 December 1995 and 29 October 2000.

Akayev was initially seen as an economically right-wing liberal leader. He commented in a 1991 interview that "Although I am a Communist, my basic attitude toward private property is favorable. I believe that the revolution in the sphere of economics was not made by Karl Marx but by Adam Smith." 
As late as 1993 political analysts saw Akayev as a "prodemocratic physicist." He actively promoted privatization of land and other economic assets and operated a relatively liberal regime compared with the governments of the other Central Asian nations. He was granted lifelong immunity from prosecution by the Lower House of Parliament in 2003.

Akayev was supportive of the Kyrgyzstani Neo-Tengrist movement.

Protests

The first wave of demonstrations took place in mid-March 2002. Azimbek Beknazarov, a member of parliament accused of abuse of power, was due to attend trial taking place in Jalal-Abad. Over 2,000 demonstrators marched on the town where the proceedings were to take place. According to eyewitnesses, police ordered the demonstrators to stop and gave them fifteen minutes to disperse, yet opened fire before this time elapsed. Five men were shot dead; another was killed on the next day. 61 people were injured, including 47 police and 14 civilians.

Riot police clashed with protesters in Bishkek in May during demonstrations in support of Beknazarov. Police in the capital's Parliament square kicked protesters and dragged people away to break up the 200-strong crowd. They made several demands including the resignation of Akayev. This was again repeated in November of the same year when scores were arrested as the opposition marched on the capital. Protests continued, albeit on a smaller scale, at various points over the next few years.

2005 election controversy

Akayev had promised to step down from office when his third term expired in 2005, but the possibility of a dynastical succession had been raised. His son Aidar Akayev and his daughter Bermet Akayeva were candidates in the 2005 legislative election, and it was widely suspected that he was going to retain either de facto power by arranging for the election of a close supporter or relative, or perhaps even by abrogation of the term limit provision in the constitution and remaining in power personally, an allegation which he strongly denied.

The results of the elections were disputed, with allegations of vote-rigging. Two of Akayev's children won seats.  Serious protests broke out in Osh and Jalal-Abad, with protesters occupying administration buildings and the Osh airport.  The government declared that it was ready to negotiate with the demonstrators. However an opposition leader said talks would only be worthwhile if the President himself took part.

Akayev refused to resign, but pledged not to use force to end the protests, which he attributed to foreign interests seeking to provoke a large-scale clamp-down in response.

On 23 March, Akayev announced the dismissal of Interior Minister Bakirdin Subanbekov and General Prosecutor Myktybek Abdyldayev for "poor work" in dealing with the growing protests.

Downfall

On 24 March 2005, protesters stormed the presidential compound in the central square of Bishkek and seized control of the seat of state power after clashing with riot police during a large opposition rally. Opposition supporters also seized control of key cities and towns in the south to press demands that Akayev step down.

That day, Akayev fled the country with his family, reportedly escaping first to Kazakhstan and then to Russia. Russian president Vladimir Putin invited Akayev to stay in Russia. There were early reports that he had tendered his resignation to opposition leaders before his departure. However, his formal resignation did not come until 4 April, when a delegation of members of parliament from Kyrgyzstan met him in Russia.

The Kyrgyz Parliament accepted the resignation on 11 April 2005, after stripping him and his family members of special privileges that had been granted to him by the previous parliament. He was also formally stripped of the title of "First President of Kyrgyzstan".

Current position and activities

Akayev now works as Professor and Senior Researcher of Prigogine Institute for Mathematical Investigations of Complex Systems at Moscow State University. Together with Andrey Korotayev and George Malinetsky he is a coordinator of the Russian Academy of Sciences Program "System Analysis and Mathematical Modeling of World Dynamics". He is also Academic Supervisor of the Laboratory for Monitoring the Risks of Socio-Political Destabilization at the National Research University Higher School of Economics in Moscow.

In July 2021, Akayev was put on a wanted list for his involvement in operations at the Kumtor Gold Mine. The following month, Akayev returned to Bishkek for the first time in 16 years in order to cooperate with the investigation, expressing his appreciation to President Sadyr Japarov for allowing him to return. In December 2021, the criminal prosecution was discontinued.

In the 2022 Kyrgyzstan–Tajikistan clashes, Akayev commented on Tajikistan's invasion of Kyrgyz territory. Accusing Emomali Rahmon of a carefully planned and pre-planned act of aggression. Akaev called Rahmon ungrateful and recalled that 30 years ago, during the civil war in Tajikistan, Kyrgyzstan provided "the greatest help and political, moral and humanitarian support to the brotherly people of Tajikistan.".

Honours

Foreign honours 
 : Grand Cross (or 1st Class) of the Order of the White Double Cross (2003)
 In 2012 he was awarded with the Gold Kondratieff Medal by the International N. D. Kondratieff Foundation.
  Kazakhstan: Order of Dostyk (2001)

Publications
 Когерентные оптические вычислительные машины (в соавт., Ленинград, 1977),
 Оптические методы обработки информации (в соавт., М., 1983);
 Holographic Memory. New York, NY: Allerton Press, 1997;
 Избранные лекции по оптическим компьютерам, Бишкек, 1996;
 Рельефография, Бишкек, 1996.
 Переходная экономика глазами физика (математическая модель переходной экономики). Бишкек: Учкун, 2000;
 Думая о будущем с оптимизмом: Размышления о внешней политике и мироустройстве. М.: Международные отношения, 2004.
 Современный финансово-экономический кризис в свете теории инновационно-технологического развития экономики и управления инновационным процессом // Системный мониторинг. Глобальное и региональное развитие. М.: Editorial URSS, 2009. . С. 141–162.
 О новой методологии долгосрочного циклического прогнозирования динамики развития мировой системы и России // Прогноз и моделирование кризисов и мировой динамики. — М.: ЛИБРОКОМ, 2009. С. 5-69.
 Log-Periodic Oscillation Analysis Forecasts the Burst of the «Gold Bubble» // Structure and Dynamics 4/3 (2010): 1-11 (with Alexey Fomin, Sergey Tsirel, and Andrey Korotayev).
 Моделирование и прогнозирование мировой динамики. М.: ИСПИ РАН, 2012. 
 On the dynamics of the world demographic transition and financial-economic crises forecasts // The European Physical Journal 205, 355-373 (2012) (with Viktor Sadovnichy & Andrey Korotayev).
 Global Inflation Dynamics: regularities & forecasts  // Structure and Dynamics 5/3 (2012): 1-15 (with Andrey Korotayev and Alexey Fomin).
 Technological development and protest waves: Arab spring as a trigger of the global phase transition // Technological Forecasting & Social Change 116 (2017): 316–321 (with Andrey Korotayev).

See also
Politics of Kyrgyzstan

References

External links
Biography by CIDOB Foundation
"Kyrgyz leader formally resigns" (SBS World News, 2005-04-05)
Askar Akayev's research group predicts the burst of the “Gold Bubble”
Askar Akaev forecasts the collapse of dollar in December 2012

1944 births
Living people
Presidents of Kyrgyzstan
Kyrgyzstani scientists
Kyrgyzstani economists
Kyrgyzstani expatriates in Russia
Exiled politicians
Kyrgyzstani exiles
Foreign Members of the Russian Academy of Sciences
Members of the Tajik Academy of Sciences
Communist Party of Kirghizia politicians
Central Committee of the Communist Party of the Soviet Union members
N. D. Kondratieff Medal laureates
People from Chüy Region
Recipients of the Medal of Pushkin
Academic staff of Kyrgyz Technical University
Academic staff of Moscow State University